Kosmos 214 ( meaning Cosmos 214) or Zenit-4 No.45 was a Soviet, optical film-return reconnaissance satellite launched in 1968. A Zenit-4 satellite, Kosmos 214 was the fortieth of seventy-six such spacecraft to be launched.

Spacecraft
Kosmos 18 was a Zenit-4 satellite, a second generation, high-resolution, reconnaissance satellite derived from the Vostok spacecraft used for crewed flights, the satellites were developed by OKB-1. The focal length of the main camera was greater than the diameter of the capsule so the camera made use of a mirror to fold the light path. The ground resolution is not publicly known but it is believed to have been 1–2 m.

Launch
Kosmos 214 was launched by the Voskhod 11A57 rocket, serial number V15001-12, flying from Site 41/1 at the Plesetsk Cosmodrome. The launch took place at 10:33:00 GMT on 18 April 1968, and following its successful arrival in orbit the spacecraft received its Kosmos designation, along with the International Designator 1968-032A and the Satellite Catalog Number 03203.

Mission
After eight days in orbit, Kosmos 214 was deorbited, with its return capsule descending under parachute and landing at 09:36 GMT on 26 April 1968, and recovered by the Soviet forces in the steppe in Kazakhstan.

See also 

 1968 in spaceflight

References 

Spacecraft which reentered in 1968
Kosmos satellites
Reconnaissance satellites of the Soviet Union
1968 in the Soviet Union
Spacecraft launched in 1968